Molesworth may refer to:

Places
Molesworth, Cambridgeshire, a village in Huntingdonshire, Cambridgeshire, England
Molesworth (crater), a crater on Mars
Molesworth Station, New Zealand's largest farm 
Molesworth Street, Dublin, Ireland
Molesworth Street, Wellington, the street where New Zealand's Parliament Buildings are located
Molesworth, Ontario, a community in Southwestern Ontario, Canada
Molesworth, Victoria, Australia
RAF Molesworth, a US air force base near Molesworth, Cambridgeshire, England
Molesworth, Tasmania, Australia
Molesworth, a proposed name for Nelson by the New Zealand Company

Organizations
Molesworth Institute, a library-related organization in the United States

People
Molesworth (surname)

Family titles
Viscount Molesworth of Swords
Baron Molesworth of Philipstown, (see Viscount Molesworth)
Baronet Molesworth of Pencarrow (Molesworth-St Aubyn Baronets)

Fictional characters
Nigel Molesworth, a fictional character in a series of humorous books by Geoffrey Willans parodying school life